Kristinn Hafliðason (born 3 June 1975) is a retired Icelandic football midfielder.

References

1975 births
Living people
Kristinn Haflidason
Kristinn Haflidason
Kristinn Haflidason
Kristinn Haflidason
Raufoss IL players
Kristinn Haflidason
Kristinn Haflidason
Kristinn Haflidason
Association football midfielders
Kristinn Haflidason
Kristinn Haflidason
Kristinn Haflidason
Kristinn Haflidason